The 1893 Missouri Tigers football team was an American football team that represented the University of Missouri as a member of the Western Interstate University Football Association (WIUFA) during the 1893 college football season. In its first season under head coach Harry Orman Robinson, the team compiled a 4–3 record (2–1 against WIUFA championship) and tied with Kansas for the conference championship.

Schedule

References

Missouri
Missouri Tigers football seasons
Missouri Tigers football